Megamaths is a BBC educational television series for primary schools that was originally aired on BBC Two from 16 September 1996 to 4 February 2002. For its first four series, it was set in a castle on top of Table Mountain, populated by the four card suits (Kings, Queens and Jacks/Jackies, and a Joker who looked after children that visited the castle and took part in mathematical challenges). There were two gargoyles at the portcullis of the castle named Gar and Goyle who spoke mostly in rhyme, and an animated dragon called Brimstone who lived in the castle cellar (with his pet kitten, Digit). Each episode featured a song explaining the episode's mathematical content.

The three remaining series, however, were set in a "Superhero School" space station, featuring a trainee superhero named Maths Man who was initially guided by a female tutor, Her Wholeness, in the fifth series, and later by a male tutor, His Wholeness, in the sixth and seventh series. In the fifth series, there were also recurring sketches of a quiz show named Find that Fraction hosted by Colin Cool (played by Simon Davies who co-wrote the second to fourth series with director Neil Ben and had played the King of Diamonds in all four Table Mountain series), and a sports show named Sports Stand hosted by Sue Harker (a spoof of Sue Barker, who was played by Liz Anson) and Harry Fraction (a spoof of Harry Gration, who was also played by Simon Davies), along with a supervillain named The Diddler who Maths Man had to solve mathematical problems caused by when he ventured down to Earth (in the final episode, she was revealed to actually be Her Wholeness in disguise). In the sixth series, the Superhero School gained an on-board computer named VERA (whose initials stood for "Voice-Enhanced Resource Activator", and was voiced by Su Douglas who also played the Queen of Spades in the fourth series) and a character named 2D3D who appeared in his virtual reality glasses (Maths Man now also spoke directly to the audience when he ventured down to Earth calling them his "Maths Team", and His Wholeness set a puzzle for them at the end of each episode). In the seventh and final series, the episodes were shortened from twenty minutes to fifteen, and again featured Maths Man getting sent down to Earth to solve mathematical problems in everyday life.

Series 1: Tables (1996)
The first series, which was co-written by Christopher Lillicrap (who had previously written the first, second and fourth series of the BBC's earlier primary maths show, Numbertime, as well as the El Nombre sketches of its third series), comprised ten episodes focusing on multiplication. Each episode opened and ended with the episode's table being chanted, and the Joker (played by Jenny Hutchinson) introduced it in rhyme while speaking directly to the audience (she would also welcome teams of schoolchildren who came to visit the castle and give them advice as they took part in mathematical challenges). The two gargoyles, Gar (male) and Goyle (female), also made observations on the mathematical happenings in the castle then summarised what its residents learned near the end of each episode (the week's table would also be displayed on the portcullis as it lowered), and the castle pets, Brimstone the dragon and Digit the kitten (who were drawn by Bevanfield Films in this series), had their own adventures below stairs in the cellar.

This series was originally aired on Mondays as part of the BBC's schools programmes strand, then entitled Daytime on Two, at 9:40am.

Series 2: Money (January–February 1998)
The second series, which was produced in 1997 after the BBC's corporate change (as evidenced by the then-new BBC logo at the end of each episode), comprised five episodes focusing on money to particular amounts. Each episode opened with an auction where the royals bid each other up to that week's money amount, and this series also saw the arrival of a new Joker played by former Children's ITV host Gareth Jones (but while the original Joker possessed the ability to appear and disappear by snapping her fingers, he did not possess any magical powers). Brimstone and Digit also underwent a redesign in this series by new animators Tony Garth Films Ltd, and their appearance was significantly different to how they had originally appeared for the first series (as they looked more comical).

This series and the next two were originally screened on Tuesdays as part of the newly renamed Schools Programmes strand at 11:15am.

Series 3: Division (February–March 1998)
The third series, which was again produced in 1997 after the BBC's corporate change (as evidenced by the then-new BBC logo at the end of each episode), comprised five episodes focusing on division by particular amounts. Each episode featured a quintet of acrobats who would repeatedly rearrange themselves to show how division was related to multiplication, and because this series was aired directly after the second one, they could have been seen as one series until they were issued as separate Video Plus Packs (reflecting that they were not).

Series 4: Measure (1999)
The fourth series, which was produced in 1998 (and the last to be set at the castle on Table Mountain), comprised five episodes focusing on units of measurement. Brimstone and Digit also underwent a second redesign for their final series by second new animators Blue Sunflower Animation, but their appearance was only slightly different to how they had appeared for the second and third series.

Series 5: Fractions (2000)
The fifth series, which was produced in 1999, comprised five episodes focusing on fractions and decimals (and was the first to be set at the Superhero School space station). The trainee superhero, Maths Man (played by Craig Heaney), was guided by his mathematical tutor Her Wholeness (played by Kim Vithana), with recurring sketches of quiz show Find that Fraction with Colin Cool and sports show Sports Stand with Sue Harker and Harry Fraction. Each week, Her Wholeness would also receive a call from Earth about mathematical problems caused by supervillain The Diddler, and send Maths Man down to Earth to solve them (in the final episode, she was revealed to actually be Her Wholeness in disguise). This was also the only series that was reissued as a DVD Plus Pack.

This first Superhero School-themed series was originally transmitted on Mondays as part of the Schools Programmes strand at 11:50am.

Series 6: Shape and Space (2001)
The sixth series, which was produced in 2000, comprised five episodes focusing on shape, space and position. Maths Man (now played by Paul Vates), was now guided by a new mathematical tutor His Wholeness (played by Clive Perrott), and aided by Superhero School's new on-board computer VERA whose initials were an acronym for "Voice-Enhanced Resource Activator", along with a character named 2D3D who appeared in his virtual reality glasses. In this series, Maths Man would speak directly to the audience when he was sent down to Earth referring to them as his "Maths Team", and His Wholeness would also set a puzzle for them at the end of each episode.

This second Superhero School-based series was originally transmitted on Fridays as part of the Schools Programmes strand at 11:30am.

Series 7: Problem Solving (2002)
The seventh and final series, which was produced in 2001 and shortened the episode length from twenty minutes to fifteen, comprised five episodes focusing on solving various mathematical problems. Maths Man, again played by Paul Vates, was again sent down to Earth to solve mathematical problems in everyday life. This series also featured the character Princess Nebulous, played by Paven Virk.

This third Superhero School-themed series was originally transmitted on Mondays as part of the Schools Programmes strand at 11:50am.

Resources

VHS
All seven series were issued as Video Plus Packs in the same year they aired by BBC Educational Publishing (now BBC Active), which slightly altered the episodes to add the BBC's Video Plus branding to them (and, in some cases, to remove the opening titles).

Books
Teachers' notes were published for the first four series at the times they premiered, and they were included with their respective Video Plus Packs along with activity books that featured photocopiable worksheets and the words to the series' songs. Activity packs featuring the activity books, along with audio cassettes featuring songs of the series and A2 posters for classroom walls, were also released.

CD-ROMs
In 1998, one year after the BBC's corporate change, Logotron Limited released a CD-ROM based on the first series. The BBC themselves also had a webpage for the series at this time, based around the castle and featuring games set in it, but it has since been taken down.

DVDs
Despite the fact that all seven series were issued as Video Plus Packs, only the fifth one was ever reissued as a DVD Plus Pack in 2006.

References

External links
 
 Megamaths at Broadcast for Schools

1990s British children's television series
2000s British children's television series
1996 British television series debuts
2002 British television series endings
BBC children's television shows
BBC Television shows
British children's education television series
British television series with live action and animation
British television shows featuring puppetry
British television shows for schools
English-language television shows
Mathematics education television series